The following is a timeline of the history of the city of Cologne, Germany.

Prior to the 14th century

 13 CE - Germanicus headquartered in Cologne.
 15 CE - Town becomes administrative capital of Germania Inferior (approximate date).
 50 CE - Romans establish Colonia.
 80 CE - Eifel Aqueduct built.
 90 CE - Population: 45,000.
 260 - Cologne becomes capital of Gallic Empire.
 310 - Bridge built over Rhine.
 313 - Catholic diocese of Cologne established (approximate date).
 451 - The Huns under Attila sack Cologne.
 459 - Ripuarian Franks take power.
 475 - Becomes the residence of the Frankish king Childeric I.
 716 - Battle of Cologne.
 795 - City becomes Archbishop's see.
 960 - Great St. Martin Church founded.
 974 - St. Andreas Church consecrated.
 980 - Church of St. Pantaleon consecrated.
 1003 - Deutz Abbey founded.
 1065 - St. Maria im Kapitol built.
 1106 - Church of the Holy Virgins built (approximate date).
 1114 - Coat of arms of Cologne in use.
 1160 - St. Cäcilien church built (approximate date).
 1182 - City expands with suburbs and ramparts.
 1184 - Richerzeche formed (approximate date).
 1201 - The city joined the Hanseatic League.
 1227 - St. Gereon's Basilica built.
 1247 - St. Kunibert church consecrated.
 1248 - Cologne Cathedral construction begins.
 1250 - Great St. Martin Church built.
 1259 - Konrad von Hochstaden (Archbishop of Cologne) expels the Richerzeche.
 1260 - Church of the Minorites built (approximate date).
 1288 - Battle of Worringen.

14th-18th centuries

 1322
 Cologne Cathedral choir consecrated.
 Municipal archive in operation (approximate date).
 1334 - Cologne Charterhouse founded.
 1388 - University of Cologne established.
 1396 - Constitution of Cologne in effect.
 1400 - Gothic artist known as "Master of Saint Veronica" active (approximate date).
 1414 - Jews expelled.
 1447 -  built.
 1450 - Dreikönigsgymnasium founded.
 1466 - Ulrich Zell sets up printing press.
 1473 - Work on Cologne Cathedral west front and towers suspended until 19th century
 1475 - City becomes free imperial city.
 1569 - Cologne City Hall building expanded.
 1583/88 - Cologne War a religious conflict.
 1584 - Apostolic Nuncio established.
 1586 - Battle of Werl.
 1608 - Protestants banished.
 1626
 Bertram Hilden sets up printing business.
 Witch trials begin (approximate date).
 1709 - Eau de Cologne launched by Giovanni Maria Farina.
 1734 -  begins publication.
 1783 - Theater an der Schmierstraße built.
 1794 - Population: 40,000.
 1795 - City directory published.
 1796 - City annexed by French First Republic.
 1798
 University of Cologne closes.
  newspaper begins publication.

19th century

 1801 - Treaty of Lunéville incorporates the city into France.
 1802 - Hänneschen puppet theatre founded.
 1815 - Prussians take power, viz Congress of Vienna.
 1823 - Rosenmontag (carnival) begins.
 1827 - Gürzenich Orchestra Cologne formed.
 1839 - Stollwerck confectionery established.
 1840 - Gürzenich Orchestra Cologne active.
 1842
 Rheinische Zeitung begins publication.
 Central-Dombauverein zu Köln (Central Cathedral Building Society) recommences construction work on Cologne Cathedral after 400 years.
 1848 - Neue Rheinische Zeitung begins publication.
 1849 - Population: 94,789 in city; 497,330 in region.
 1850 - Conservatorium der Musik founded.
 1853 - Diözesanmuseum founded.
 1857 - Hotel du Dome opens.
 1859
 Cathedral Bridge built.
 Köln Hauptbahnhof opens.
 1860 - Zoo founded.
 1861
 Wallraf-Richartz Museum and Glockengasse Synagogue built.
 Population: 120,568 in city; 567,435 in region.
 1863 - Hotel Ernst opens.
 1864 - Flora park laid out.
 1872
 Theater in der  built.
 Zimmermann bakery in business.
 1874 -  restored.
 1876 - Kölner Stadt-Anzeiger begins publication.
 1877 - Cologne Stadtbahn opens.
 1880 - Cologne Cathedral completed.
 1885
 Population: 239,437.
 City walls dismantled.
 1888 - Bayenthal, Ehrenfeld, Lindenthal and Nippes incorporated into city.

 1890 - Public Library established.
 1894 - Main station rebuilt.
 1900 - Population: 370,685.

20th century

1900-1945
 1902 - Theater am Habsburger Ring built.
 1904 - Oper der Stadt Köln formed.
 1905 - Population: 428,503.
 1906 - Schnütgen Museum founded.
 1908 - 21 September: Mathematician Minkowski delivers "Raum und Zeit" lecture on spacetime.
 1910
 Kalk and  incorporated into city.
 Population: 516,527.
 1911 - Hohenzollern Bridge built.
 1913 - Rheinpark and Köln Messe/Deutz station open.
 1914 - Werkbund Exhibition held.
 1917 - Konrad Adenauer becomes mayor.
 1919
 Consulate of Poland opens.
 Population: 633,904.
 1921 - Jawne school built.
 1925 - Population: 705,477.
 1926
 Airport opens.
 Kölner Werkschulen established.
 1928
 Messeturm Köln built.
 Polish Consulate relocated to Frankfurt, and replaced by a Polish Consular Agency in Cologne.
 1930
 Polish Consular Agency closed.
 November: Flood.
 1934 - University of Cologne reopens.
 1938 - Kristallnacht.
 1939 - Nazi camp for Sinti and Romani people established (see also Porajmos).
 1940 - Bombing begins.
 1942 - III SS construction brigade (forced labour camp) established by the SS. Its prisoners were mostly Poles and Soviets.
 1944
 May: III SS construction brigade camp relocated to Wieda.
 12 August: Ford-Werke subcamp of the Buchenwald concentration camp established. Its prisoners were mostly Soviets.
 15 August: Köln Stadt subcamp of the Buchenwald concentration camp established. Its prisoners were mostly Eastern Europeans.
 27 September: Westwaggon subcamp of the Buchenwald concentration camp established. Its prisoners were mostly Soviets.
 25 October: Köln Stadt subcamp of Buchenwald dissolved. Prisoners deported to the main Buchenwald camp.
 November: Ehrenfeld Group executed.
 November: 1. SS-Eisenbahnbaubrigade subcamp of the Mittelbau-Dora concentration camp based in Cologne.

 1945
 February: Ford-Werke subcamp of Buchenwald dissolved. Prisoners deported to the main Buchenwald camp.
 February: 1. SS-Eisenbahnbaubrigade subcamp relocated from Cologne.
 March: Westwaggon subcamp of Buchenwald dissolved. Many prisoners deported to the main Buchenwald camp, dozens managed to escape.
 American troops capture city.

1946-1990s
 1946 - Kölnische Rundschau begins publication.
 1947
 27 March: Food protest.
 Sport University founded.
 Nordwestdeutschen Rundfunk orchestra formed.
 1949
 Kölner Stadt-Anzeiger resumes publication.
 Cologne Furniture Fair begins.
 1950 - Photokina trade fair begins.
 1951 - Cologne Bonn Airport opens.
 1954
 Italian Cultural Institute in Cologne founded.
 Cappella Coloniensis formed.
 1955
 February–March: City co-hosts the 1955 Ice Hockey World Championships.
  rebuilt.
 1957
 Central Station rebuilt.
 Opera house built.
 Cable Car begins operating.
 City hosts Bundesgartenschau (national horticulture biennial).
 1960
 Stadtwerke Köln established.
 Population: 803,616.
 1964
  newspaper begins publication.
 School massacre.
 Forstbotanischer Garten created.
 1967 - Kölner Kunstmarkt begins.
 1971 - Cologne University of Applied Sciences formed.
 1973 -  headquartered in city.
 1976 - Gebühreneinzugszentrale and Museum Ludwig established.
 1977 -  headquartered in city.
 1981 - Colonius tower built.

 1983
 April: Flood.
 Akademie för uns Kölsche Sproch established.
 1984
 Centrum Schwule Geschichte established.
 Turkish-Islamic Union for Religious Affairs headquartered in city.
 Feminale film festival begins.
 1985
 Käthe Kollwitz Museum opens.
 St. George's School founded.
 1986 -  headquartered in city.
 1988 - NS Documentation Center established.
 1990 - Academy of Media Arts Cologne established.
 1991 - Cologne Conference (television and film festival) and Cologne Comedy Festival begin.
 1992 - Cologne Festival of Early Music begins.
 1993
 Imhoff-Schokoladenmuseum opens.
 Cologne Business School established.
 Ringfest begins.
 1994 - Central Council of Muslims in Germany headquartered in city.
 1996 - Summerjam reggae festival begins.
 1998
 September: City hosts the 1998 World Rowing Championships.
 Lanxess Arena opens.
 1999
 City website online (approximate date).
 25th G8 summit held in Cologne.
 2000
 Internationale Filmschule Köln established.
 Population: 962,884.

21st century

 2001
 April–May: City co-hosts the 2001 IIHF World Championship.
 KölnTurm built.
  (archives) headquartered in Cologne.
 2002 - Köln–Frankfurt high-speed rail line begins operating.
 2004
 9 June: Bombing.
 MediaPark constructed.
 2005
 City hosts Catholic World Youth Day.
 Weltstadthaus built.
 2006
 International Women's Film Festival Dortmund/Cologne begins.
 KölnTriangle built.
 2009 - Jürgen Roters becomes mayor.
 2010 - Population: 1,007,119
 2014 - Rainer Maria Cardinal Woelki succeeds Joachim Cardinal Meisner as archbishop of Cologne
 2015 - Henriette Reker becomes first female mayor of Cologne, one day after an assassination attempt on her at a market in Braunsfeld
 2015-2016 - 2015-16 New Year's Eve sexual assaults in Germany
 2017
 May: City co-hosts the 2017 IIHF World Championship.
 Cologne Central Mosque is completed.
 2018
 January: Flood.
 13 June: Terrorist plot foiled.
 15 October: 2018 Cologne attack

See also
 History of Cologne
 List of mayors of Cologne
 Elector of Cologne
 Timelines of other cities in the state of North Rhine-Westphalia:(de) Aachen, Bonn, Dortmund, Duisburg, Düsseldorf, Essen, Münster

References

This article incorporates information from the German Wikipedia.

Bibliography

in English
 
 
 
 
 
 
 
 
 
  (fulltext)

in German

External links

 Europeana. Items related to Cologne, various dates.

Years in Germany
 
Cologne
Cologne-related lists